Phillip Jess Sproson (born 13 October 1959) is an English former footballer who played as a central defender. He played in 500 matches (426 in the league) for Port Vale and scored 41 goals (33 in the league), this places him second in the list of appearances for Port Vale. He was the nephew of Port Vale defender Roy Sproson and son of Jess Sproson, who played for Vale between 1940 and 1947.

A strong and technically competent central defender, he helped Port Vale to win promotion out of the Fourth Division in 1982–83 and 1985–86, and was twice named on the PFA Team of the Year. Forced to retire in February 1989 due to a knee injury, he attempted a comeback with Birmingham City, and later represented Stafford Rangers and Northwich Victoria. He remained in the game after his retirement and later became a football agent.

Career

Port Vale
Sproson was spotted by Port Vale coach Reg Berks after Berks visited Thistley Hough High School to see the team play. After asking for the youngster's address, he paid him a visit later in the day to get him on a contract, at which point he discovered the youngster was the nephew of Vale's manager, Roy Sproson. Berks asked the uncle why he had not told him he had a young family member who could play football, to which he responded "I didn't know I'd got one!". In the Vale youth team, Sproson was a midfielder, though as he grew into a tall young man he was converted into a centre-half role. He rejected an apprenticeship at Stoke City and instead became an apprentice electrician until new manager Bobby Smith offered him forms with Port Vale in December 1977.

He featured in two Third Division games towards the end of the 1977–78 season. With the "Valiants" relegated into the Fourth Division, Sproson found first team chances easier to come by at Vale Park as he played 25 games in the 1978–79 season under the stewardship of Dennis Butler. He scored his first senior goal on 15 September 1979, in a 5–0 home win over Northampton Town. He established himself in the first team under new boss John McGrath, and played 40 games in the 1979–80 season. He went on to feature 50 times in the 1980–81 campaign, and missed just three games all season. He scored five goals in 51 games in the 1981–82 season, after missing just four league matches. The 1982–83 season proved highly successful for Sproson; he was a regular in the first team, claiming four goals in 45 games, and was included in the PFA select Fourth Division side as Vale were promoted in third place. Stoke City manager Richie Barker had tried to sign Sproson earlier in the season, but was put off by Vale's high asking price, so instead signed Paul Dyson.

The club suffered relegation in 1983–84, with Sproson scoring four goals in 44 appearances. Sproson maintained his first team place in the 1984–85 campaign under the management of John Rudge, as he played 54 of the Vale's 56 games. In the 1985–86 season, Sproson was appointed as club captain, and missed just two games as Port Vale were again promoted out of the Fourth Division; he was again selected in the PFA team of the year. He scored four goals in 52 appearances in the 1986–87 season, as the only real constant presence in the Vale defence. He missed just four of Vale's 56 games in the 1987–88 season, and claimed the winning goal in the FA Cup giant-killing of First Division side Tottenham Hotspur after getting the better of goalkeeper Tony Parks and centre-back Neil Ruddock in a goalmouth scramble that resulted; Sproson later claimed he also made the best tackle of his career in the game when he lunged in front of Clive Allen to block a Mitchell Thomas cross. The 1988–89 season saw Vale promoted from the Third Division; Sproson scored five goals in 29 games. In January 1989, Sproson suffered a severe knee injury during training and retired the following month. His testimonial match was held against rivals Stoke City on 21 March 1988, Vale drew the game 1–1, and Sproson collected £12,000 of the takings.

Later career
Against medical advice, Sproson attempted a return to league football. In August 1989 he joined Dave Mackay's Birmingham City, who were obliged to pay Port Vale a "fee" of £50,000 in lieu of insurance money. He played 12 Third Division and four League Cup games for the "Blues" in the 1989–90 season, but a re-occurrence of his knee injury meant he was unable to perform at the required fitness levels, and he retired again in September 1990. He did though later play for Conference sides Stafford Rangers and Northwich Victoria.

Style of play
Sproson was a physical central defender who could pass with either foot and was strong in the air.

Post-retirement
Sproson worked as head of the PFA's Player Management Agency, but stood down in March 2009 to work on his own account. He has worked as an agent to players such as Curtis Davies, Marlon Harewood and Liam Dickinson. He has also acted as agent for Adam Crookes and Joe Worrall, as well as numerous players at Nottingham Forest due to his friendship with academy manager Gary Brazil. He has also worked as an analyst for BBC Radio Stoke.

Family
He was the nephew of Port Vale club record appearance holder Roy Sproson and son of Jess Sproson, who played for Vale between 1940 and 1947. His son, Warren, also played for the club's youth team.

Career statistics
Source:

Honours
Individual
PFA Fourth Division Team of the Year: 1982–83
PFA Fourth Division Team of the Year: 1985–86

Port Vale
Football League Fourth Division 3rd-place finish (promoted): 1982–83
Football League Fourth Division 4th-place finish (promoted): 1985–86

References

Footballers from Stoke-on-Trent
English footballers
Association football central defenders
Port Vale F.C. players
Birmingham City F.C. players
Stafford Rangers F.C. players
Northwich Victoria F.C. players
English Football League players
National League (English football) players
British sports agents
Association football agents
1959 births
Living people